Concert in Blue (stylised as CONCERT IN~BLUE) is an in-studio live performance installation, also released as film, (the second live release) by Swedish audiovisual project iamamiwhoami, led by singer-songwriter Jonna Lee. It was released on 2 September 2015 in both physical and digital formats. The album was announced on 30 April 2015 through the website of Lee's label, To whom it may concern, and on the same day, it was made available for pre-order via the same website. The live show of Concert In Blue was recorded (and streamed) on 29 April 2015. The concert also sees the release of the first new iamamiwhoami song since 2014, titled "The Deadlock", which was the first single released from the album on 2 September 2015.

Background
One month before the 29 April 2015 stream of the concert itself, iamamiwhoami asked their fans in a short video to submit photos or videos of themselves to be incorporated into the live show. The request asked fans to sing along with songs from BLUE in their videos. The videos were incorporated into the stage dressings of "the last dancer", "blue blue" and "shadowshow", while the photographs became a slideshow during "goods"; for "shadowshow", Jonna also appeared on the backdrop in splitscreen, imitating fans' movements. The new song ("The Deadlock") featured on this release was not registered in any database, or heard of until the event. The song name was first revealed via a tweet from To whom it may concern., with the hashtag, #thedeadlock, while the song streamed in concert. It was then visible in the credits, and later added to the track-list on the To whom it may concern website. Japanese fashion designer Comme des Garçons provided the unique, titular garment for the "Deadlock" performance.

For the concert proper, Jonna Lee, keyboardist/producer Claes Björklund, drummer Thomas Hedlund and backing vocalist Beatrice Johansson perform in all white unitards in front of a large projection screen. The lighting is minimal, mainly using flood and floor lamps. There are regular breaks throughout the performance for Lee to change outfits; during these moments, the footage cuts to an all-white room where performers in white zentai (referred to as "Shadows") wrangle instruments for the stage, browse galleries of fan photographs or dance along with the music. For several songs, Shadows join Jonna in front of the large projection screen for a dance number.

As an encore, a fan video featuring an American couple begins on the projection screen. After a brief, conversation from the couple, Björklund and Hedlund begin performing "chasing kites", with Jonna re-emerging to sing the vocal line alongside the couple on screen. The footage cuts to the credits of the film at the first chorus.

Release
The concert was released on the towhomitmayconcern website, iTunes, Vimeo and Spotify. Digital release, Standard edition CD and 12-inch vinyl LP editions of Concert In Blue, as well as a limited-edition DVD bundle (including extra bridges and an outro), were made available via To whom it may concern's official online shop on 30 April 2015; the physical releases were exclusively released by To whom it may concern. All three physical editions include a 64-page book with images, illustrations, artworks, still images and text from the concert and the BLUE audiovisual series collected from the community around iamamiwhoami and the project itself.

Critical reception

Alex Jeffery of musicOMH noted that, "while undoubtedly rough around the edges, the ‘installation’ was armed with a riot of blazing ideas that imaginatively utilized the natural environment", and later noted, "while this had entertaining moments... new supporters are unlikely to be attracted. Although perhaps that is the point"

Track listing
All lyrics written by Jonna Lee; all tracks written by Lee and Claes Björklund.

Notes
 All tracks are stylised in lowercase letters. For example, "The Deadlock" is stylised as "the deadlock".

Personnel
Credits adapted from the To whom it may concern. website, as well as the credits shown after the concert.

Music

 Jonna Lee – executive production, instruments, lyrics, mixing, music, vocals, keyboards
 Claes Björklund – synthesizers, computers, instruments, mixing, music, production, vocals
 Thomas Hedlund - drums
 Beatrice Johansson – backing vocals
 Joel Modin – sound engineer

Visual

 Jonna Lee – executive production
 Beatrice Johansson – production coordination
 Mathieu Mirano – costume
 Comme des Garçons – "the deadlock" costume
 Niklas Johannson – camera operation
 Viktor Kumlin – camera operation
 WAVE – post-production, direction
 Chris Higham – technical crew
 Per Olsson – technical crew
 Sergio C Ayala – DIT
 Caroline Olofsson – styling
 Linnéa Lindgren Persson – production assistant

Artwork
 John Strandh – photography direction
 Jan Scharlau – graphic design

Release history

References

2015 live albums
Concert films
iamamiwhoami live albums
Live electropop albums
Live video albums